The NeXT character set (often aliased as NeXTSTEP encoding vector, WE8NEXTSTEP or next-multinational) was used by the NeXTSTEP and OPENSTEP operating systems on NeXT workstations beginning in 1988. It is based on Adobe Systems' PostScript (PS) character set aka Adobe Standard Encoding where unused code points were filled up with characters from ISO 8859-1 (Latin 1), although at differing code points.

Character set
The following table shows the NeXT character set. Each character is shown with a potential Unicode equivalent. Codepoints 00hex (0) to 7Fhex (127) are nearly identical to ASCII.

See also
Display PostScript (DPS)

References

NeXT
Character sets